HMS Urania was a U-class destroyer of the British Royal Navy that saw service during World War II. After the war she was converted into a Type 15 fast anti-submarine frigate and was scrapped in 1971.

Service history

Second World War service
Urania saw service during the Second World War as part of the British Pacific Fleet.

Post War service
From 1947 until 1950 Urania was held in reserve at Devonport Dockyard. She was converted into a reserve fleet accommodation ship in 1949, and was based at Devonport. On 11 November 1950 she arrived at Hawthorn Leslie on the Tyne for a refit and was again in reserve at Harwich in 1952.

On 23 April 1953 she arrived in Liverpool for conversion into a Type 15 fast anti-submarine frigate, by Harland and Wolff. Her pennant number was also changed from R05 to F08.

They collectively took part in the Suez Operation and Cyprus emergency before returning home.

In 1958 she was returned to the reserve at Devonport dockyard before another refit. On 7 January 1959 she re-commissioned for trials before returning to reserve.

Decommissioning and disposal
From 1962 until 1967 she was held in reserve at Devonport. In January 1967 she was transferred to the operational reserve. She was subsequently sold for scrap and arrived at Faslane for breaking up on 2 February 1971.

Notes

Publications
 
 
 
 
 

 

U and V-class destroyers of the Royal Navy
Ships built in Barrow-in-Furness
1943 ships
World War II destroyers of the United Kingdom
Cold War destroyers of the United Kingdom
Type 15 frigates
Cold War frigates of the United Kingdom